Freedo or variants may refer to

Freedo (producer), German music producer
Freedo, penguin cartoon mascot of Linux-libre, an operating system kernel and software package
FreeDO, an emulator for the 3DO

See also
 FreeDOS operating system
 Fredo given name